Shade 3D is a 3D modeling, rendering, animation, 3D printing computer program developed by e frontier Japan and published by Mirye Software. In October 2013, Shade 3D development team formed a new company called Shade3D Co.,Ltd., and continue to develop and market the program. After terminating the sales agreement with e frontier Japan and Mirye Software by the end of December 2014, Shade3D company is now developing and marketing Shade 3D products in Japan and worldwide exclusively.

History
Shade was first published in Japan in the mid 1980s, making it one of the oldest 3D applications on macOS and Windows. E Frontier, a Japanese software company acquired Shade from its previous owner ExpressionTools in the early 2000s. E Frontier later acquired Curious Labs, the developer of Poser and marketed Shade through a subsidiary E Frontier America. E Frontier America sold its directly owned assets to Smith Micro. In 2009, Mirye Software started localization and publishing of Shade in the English language worldwide until 2014 December. After then, Shade3D Co.,Ltd is now handling both Japanese and English version development and worldwide marketing included Japan. Shade 3D has an estimated 200,000 users worldwide.

Special features
Shade 3D supports polygon modeling, however all versions of Shade support curved surface modeling based on bezier based lines - a unique modeling method similar to bezier based vector editing tools such as Adobe Illustrator and not available in some other 3D modeling applications. Shade also supports NURBS based modeling. Modeling in Shade is done with Metric or Imperial measurements selected making Shade useful for architecture.

The Professional version of Shade creates large renders.  Shade 14 Pro renders up to 22528x22528.  This render size is larger than the 12000x8700 IMAX digital version theoretical display size. In print, a 1200dpi A3 document(11.7x16.5in/297x420mm) is 14032x19842.

Shade 3D has specific features for 3D printing using the Shade 3D Print Assistant, a feature to interactively diagnose and fix common problems with 3d models used with 3d printers, such as working with manifold geometry.
  
The current Shade 14 supports a wide variety of popular formats including adobe formats (ai, psd, swf), movie formats (avi, mov, QuickTime VR panorama, QuickTime VR cubic, QuickTime VR object), 3d formats (obj, lwo, 3ds, dxf, rib), video game digital asset formats (bvh, direct x, COLLADA, collada animation, Blue Mars, Second Life), picture formats (bmp, targa, tiff, png, epix, hdr, openEXR), and format options with toon rendering on export (ai, swf) among others. This wide format support of popular application formats makes working between programs easier than usual.

Because of its history with the Poser product line, some versions of Shade also incorporate PoserFusion, a file hosting solution rather than a direct file import solution. This allows Shade to maintain Poser specific features within the Shade rendering environment; it is possible to later edit the original Poser file and then see the changes reflected in the hosting Shade scene.

Workflow
As mentioned, the file import and export support does allow for an extremely varied workflow.  By original design, canned Character modeling was done in Poser, those pose files were imported into Shade which could create the scene for the imported character. Shade could then rig, animate, render and export as a movie for video editing/compositing. As the comic book software Manga Studio EX has been importing the Shade format directly for some time, it seems likely that Manga Studio EX was used for print advertisement.

Versions

Shade 9 was released on January 5, 2009. Shade 9 introduced Particle Physics, Collision Detection, new Polygon Modeling Tools, Hair Salon, Parallax Bump Mapping, improvements to PoserFusion, previewing and HDRI import and export.

Shade 10 was released on February 14, 2010. Shade 10 included significant integration features with online game and MMO content, including native export of Avatar Reality Blue Mars, COLLADA and Second Life.

Shade 12 was released in March 2011. Shade 12 includes a redesigned interface based on user feedback, upgrades to boolean operations, volumetric materials and lights, strengthened modeling(addition of photo modeling, sketch modeling, mirror modeling tools, and cage modeling), animated normal mapping, displacement mapping, subsurface scattering, preview rendering, stereoscopic, unlimited maps per mesh, and unlimited rendering nodes in standard and pro versions.

A free version Shade 3D for Unity 3D lets 3D game developers create, edit and animate 3D game models then use a script to open models directly from within a Unity 3D project and then automatically return the model to the project environment.

Shade 13 was released November 12, 2012. Shade 13 added improved viewports (Scale Guide, Parallel Project, Wireframe by Color), modeling (Bevel Edge, Bevel Vertex, Replicators) and user interface customization.

Shade 14 was released August 30, 2013. Shade 14 added 3D printing tools, Line Thickness, Line Offset, LSCM UV Mapping, Quality adjustment tools (Texture, Lighting, STL Import / Export and others.

Recently, Shade 15.1 was added at DAZ3D's store in its basic, standard and professional versions.

References

Notes
End of the collaboration with our U.S publisher - Shade3D
Shade3D Co buys rights to Shade 3D from e frontier - cgchannel.com
A Look at the Macintosh 3D Market - iDevGames
e Frontier America Products acquired by Smith Micro - PoserPros
Shade R5/E: expression tools' modeling package goes west

External links
 Official website

Animation software
3D graphics software
Classic Mac OS software
Windows graphics-related software
MacOS graphics-related software